Jakub Šťastný (born 28 August 2000) is a Czech track cyclist, who competes in sprinting events.

References

External links

2000 births
Living people
Czech track cyclists
Czech male cyclists